Maluwe Mosque is a mosque located on the Bole road in the West Gonja District in the Savannah region of Ghana. It was formally in the Northern region. Maluwe is a small village east of Bui National Park.

History 
According to an imam of the mosque, it was built by a Muslim missionary from Mali. He built five mud mosques as he passed through the region along the way.

Features 
The mosque has huge and bigger parapets than Larabanga mosque. The mosque was built with mud with the Sudanic style and has two towers that are also taller than Bole mosque but does not reach the heights of Banda Nkwanta mosque. It also has two buttresses on the west side which is thicker and boxy.

References 

Mosques in Ghana
Savannah Region (Ghana)
Sudano-Sahelian architecture